Schroeder Peak is a peak, 2,230 m, standing 3 nautical miles (6 km) northwest of Mount Kopere in the Cobham Range. Mapped by the United States Geological Survey (USGS) from tellurometer surveys and Navy air photos, 1960–62. Named by Advisory Committee on Antarctic Names (US-ACAN) for James E. Schroeder, United States Antarctic Research Program (USARP) glaciologist at Little America V, 1959–60.

Mountains of Oates Land